Einar Hvoslef (21 June 1876 – 1 December 1931) was a sailor from Norway.

He was born and died in Oslo, and raced for the Royal Norwegian Yacht Club. He represented his native country at the 1908 Summer Olympics in the 8 metre class sailing, finishing fourth with the boat Fram.

References

1876 births
1931 deaths
Sportspeople from Oslo
Norwegian male sailors (sport)
Sailors at the 1908 Summer Olympics – 8 Metre
Olympic sailors of Norway